Channellock is an American company that produces hand tools. It is best known for its pliers—the company manufactures more than 140 types of pliers—particularly its eponymous style of tongue-and-groove, slip-joint pliers. Its pliers have distinctive sky-blue handle grips; the company has been using the same trademarked shade of blue since 1956.

It also produces cutting pliers, linemen's pliers, long nose pliers, adjustable wrenches, screwdrivers, nutdrivers and special-purpose pliers, as well as multi-function tools for the fire service and other first responders. According to the company, all of its pliers were manufactured at one of its two facilities in Meadville, Pennsylvania. However, not all products sold by the company are produced in the United States; products such as screwdrivers and ratchet wrenches are produced in Canada, Taiwan, or China.

History
The company was founded in 1886 when George B. DeArment, a blacksmith from Evansburg, Pennsylvania (present day Conneaut Lake, Pennsylvania), began hand-forging farrier's tools and selling them from town to town out of the back of a wagon.  He would spend the Winter forging tools, load up his wagon in the Spring when roads became passable, and set out selling his tools.  When he ran out of tools, he would sell the wagon and buy a train ticket home to Evansburg. The business eventually became known as the Champion Bolt and Clipper Company.

In 1904, the company moved to a  facility in Meadville, Pennsylvania, and added nippers, pinchers and open-end wrenches to its product line. George B. DeArment’s two sons, Almon W. and J. Howard DeArment, became partners in the company in 1911 and expanded the product line again to include hammers. In 1923, the company moved again to a  facility at its current location in Meadville. Four years later, the name of the company was changed to the Champion–DeArment Tool Company.

In 1933, Chief Engineer Howard Manning developed the tongue-and-groove, slip-joint pliers for which the company is known. In 1934, a patent for this design was granted, and in 1949, a trademark for the name "Channellock" was granted, with a first-use date of May 1, 1932.

From this point to the 1960s, the company began to focus more on the fast-growing pliers side of its business, developing improvements to the original design. The word "Channellock" eventually became so synonymous with their product that the company changed its name to Channellock, Inc. in 1963 to capitalize on the popularity of its product.

Today
Channellock is managed by the fourth and fifth generations of the DeArment family with William S. DeArment serving as CEO & Chairman of the Board, Jon S. DeArment serving as President & COO, and Ryan DeArment serving as Vice President of Sales and Marketing. , the company claimed to be the largest employer in Crawford County, Pennsylvania, with over 500 employees. The company has more than 4,000 U.S. wholesale and retail customers and ships to customers in 45 countries.

Gallery

References

External links
 
 Alloy Artifacts: "Champion DeArment Tool Company"

Tool manufacturing companies of the United States
Manufacturing companies based in Pennsylvania
Privately held companies based in Pennsylvania
Goods manufactured in the United States
Manufacturing companies established in 1886
1886 establishments in Pennsylvania